Eugène Forestier (11 January 1877 – 7 August 1950) was a French racing cyclist. He rode in the 1922 Tour de France.

References

1877 births
1950 deaths
French male cyclists
Place of birth missing